Kasrab (also Romanized as Kasrāb) is a village in Momenabad Rural District, in the Central District of Sarbisheh County, South Khorasan Province, Iran. At the 2006 census, its population was 324, in 63 families.

References 

Populated places in Sarbisheh County